Antonis Petris (born 13 November 1958) is a Greek equestrian. He competed in two events at the 2004 Summer Olympics.

References

External links
 

1958 births
Living people
Greek male equestrians
Olympic equestrians of Greece
Equestrians at the 2004 Summer Olympics
Competitors at the 2009 Mediterranean Games
Sportspeople from Nicosia
Mediterranean Games medalists in equestrian
Mediterranean Games bronze medalists for Greece